Nelson Asaytono (born January 25, 1967) is a Filipino retired professional basketball player who played for Purefoods, Swift/Sunkist/Pop Cola, San Miguel Beer, and Red Bull in the PBA during his 17-year career.

Collegiate / Amateur career

Asaytono is one of the best players ever to step up in a less-known university in University of Manila under the tutelage of former pro Loreto Tolentino, his coach at UM Hawks. His first national stint was being part of the RP Youth team that played in the 9th ABC Youth Championships held in Manila. He would become a member of the national team that same year in 1987 under coach Joe Lipa. Asaytono also played for coach Derrick Pumaren at Magnolia Ice Cream in the PABL and won three championships.

Professional career

Purefoods Hotdogs
Asaytono was drafted as the 2nd overall pick by the Purefoods Hotdogs in 1989. He played three seasons for the ballclub that had most of his former national teammates; Jojo Lastimosa, Alvin Patrimonio, Jerry Codiñera, Glenn Capacio and Dindo Pumaren. With Patrimonio at the starting forward, he mostly would come off the bench. He won two championships at Purefoods. In his final season as a Tender Juicy Hotdog in 1991, he had notable performances during the All-Filipino finals against Diet Sarsi.

Swift/Sunkist
In late 1991, Asaytono was traded by Purefoods to Swift in exchange for first round picks in 1994 and 1995. He joined the list of PBA millionaires as he was signed to a lucrative pact by the RFM franchise. For two seasons with Swift, Asaytono made it to the mythical five selection and a decent run at the Most Valuable Player (MVP) plum. In 1993, he was second in the statistical race but would up third after the polls in a frustrated bid for the most coveted award. With Vergel Meneses' first full season with Swift in 1994, Asaytono could only make it to the mythical second team selection but still performed well, averaging 18.6 points and 7.2 rebounds in 65 games. In 1995, his team came close to winning a Grand Slam, winning two titles that season, but only got third place in the Governors' Cup.

After winning four championships with Swift/Sunkist, Asaytono was traded to the San Miguel Beermen, his former team in the amateurs, in April 1996 for one-time MVP Renato Agustin.

San Miguel Beermen
Asaytono's trade to San Miguel proved to be the turning point of his career. He became the go-to-guy in Coach Ron Jacobs's rotation as well as its franchise player. In 1997, he became one of the forerunners for the MVP award but he again came short to former teammate Alvin Patrimonio. Although he lost the MVP race, he led the league in scoring.

When the team drafted future MVP Danny Ildefonso in the 1998 season, his minutes was again reduced but still he led the team in scoring. He led Beermen to the finals twice in All Filipino and Commissioner's Cup in that season, but came up short in both occasions to the Alaska Milkmen.  A year later, when Jong Uichico took over the coaching reins from Jacobs, he was relegated to the bench and was eventually traded to his former team, the Pop Cola 800s (together with William Antonio) for Dwight Lago, Boybits Victoria, and Nic Belasco.

Pop Cola, Red Bull, Career Milestone and Retirement
Asaytono's second stint Pop Cola was a forgettable one, as he started to slow down as he was still at the bench. He spent his last four seasons with the Red Bull Barako until the 2005-06 season.

On April 7, 2005, he passed Crispa great Philip Cezar for the fifth spot all-time scoring list after tallying 17 points on 6-of-9 shooting. Currently, he is fifth in the PBA all-time scoring list with 12,268 total points in 796 career games, behind only Ramon Fernandez, Abet Guidaben, Alvin Patrimonio and Atoy Co.

He had a brief stint with the Pagadian Warriors of the National Basketball Conference (NBC) before retiring. He retired in 2006.

Statistics

Correct as of the 2005-06 season

Season-by-season averages

|-
| align="left" | 1989
| align="left" | Purefoods
| 56  || 19.7 || 0.526 || 0.222 || 0.832 || 4.6 || 0.5 || 0.2 || 0.4 || 11.7
|-
| align="left" | 1990
| align="left" | Purefoods
| 53 || 21.2 || 0.554 || 0.250 || 0.802 || 4.4 || 0.9 || 0.3 || 0.4 || 14.1
|-
| align="left" | 1991
| align="left" | Purefoods
| 54 || 22.8 || 0.554 || 0.143 || 0.842 || 5.0 || 1.0 || 0.2 || 0.6 || 15.6
|-
| align="left" | 1992
| align="left" | Swift
| 69 || 35.8 || 0.560 || 0.515 || 0.825 || 8.2 || 2.1 || 0.6 || 1.2 || 22.4
|-
| align="left" | 1993
| align="left" | Swift
| 68 || 35.9 || 0.569 || 0.276 || 0.792 || 7.7 || 2.8 || 0.6 || 0.8 || 19.3
|-
| align="left" | 1994
| align="left" | Swift
| 65 || 33.1 || 0.553 || 0.266 || 0.751 || 7.2 || 2.2 || 0.3 || 0.9 || 18.6
|-
| align="left" | 1995
| align="left" | Sunkist
| 68 || 26.3 || 0.574 || 0.222 || 0.801 || 4.5 || 2.0 || 0.3 || 0.4 || 14.0
|-
| align="left" | 1996
| align="left" | Sunkist/San Miguel
| 51 || 32.6 || 0.497 || 0.346 || 0.779 || 6.3 || 2.0 || 0.5 || 0.4 || 15.9
|-
| align="left" | 1997
| align="left" | San Miguel
| 61 || 40.7 || 0.431 || 0.290 || 0.813 || 7.1 || 2.7 || 0.5 || 0.6 || 23.1
|-
| align="left" | 1998
| align="left" | San Miguel
| 65 || 32.0 || 0.438 || 0.278 || 0.728 || 5.7 || 2.1 || 0.3 || 0.3 || 14.6
|-
| align="left" | 1999
| align="left" | San Miguel/Pop Cola
| 23 || 29.2 || 0.421 || 0.171 || 0.778 || 4.3 || 1.0 || 0.6 || 0.2 || 11.8
|-
| align="left" | 2000
| align="left" | Pop Cola
| 23 || 32.7 || 0.447 || 0.323 || 0.764 || 6.3 || 2.2 || 0.5 || 0.4 || 17.0
|-
| align="left" | 2001
| align="left" | Pop Cola
| 49 || 20.1 || 0.400 || 0.242 || 0.829 || 3.1 || 1.0 || 0.2 || 0.2 || 8.4
|-
| align="left" | 2002
| align="left" | Red Bull
| 22 || 9.4 || 0.489 || 0.308 || 0.600 || 1.5 || 0.6 || 0.1 || 0.1 || 3.2
|-
| align="left" | 2003
| align="left" | Red Bull
| 38 || 14.0 || 0.511 || 0.419 || 0.671 || 3.2 || 0.7 || 0.2 || 0.1 || 7.5
|-
| align="left" | 2004–05
| align="left" | Red Bull
| 53 || 16.5 || 0.458 || 0.238 || 0.810 || 3.0 || 0.6 || 0.1 || 0.1 || 7.6
|-
| align="left" | 2005–06
| align="left" | Red Bull
| 2 || 8.5 || 0.143 || 0.500 || 0.500 || 1.0 || 0.0 || 0.0 || 0.0 || 3.0
|-
| align="left" | Career
| align="left" |
| 820 || 27.5 || 0.512 || 0.284 || 0.794 || 5.5 || 1.6 || 0.3 || 0.5 || 15.0

Personal life 
Asaytono has a daughter, Kim Arielle. On May 20, 2015, she was given multiple criminal charges after driving her car into several shops and bystanders, killing one and injuring 12 others. She and the victims settled and agreed to drop most of the charges.

Asaytono continued to play in exhibition games after he retired. In 2012, he participated in an exhibition match with fellow PBA legends against older NBA All-Stars. He also became a building contractor, building basketball courts and gyms.

In 2020, Asaytono suffered a heart attack. He was confined in the ICU of a hospital in General Trias, Cavite for four days and was discharged several days later. His former teammates and rivals and even the PBA itself helped pay for his hospital expenses.

References

1967 births
Living people
Barako Bull Energy Boosters players
Basketball players from Oriental Mindoro
Magnolia Hotshots players
People from Oriental Mindoro
Philippine Basketball Association All-Stars
Philippines men's national basketball team players
Filipino men's basketball players
Pop Cola Panthers players
Power forwards (basketball)
San Miguel Beermen players
UM Hawks basketball players
Magnolia Hotshots draft picks